Ctenotrachelus shermani is a species of assassin bug in the family Reduviidae. It is found in the Caribbean, North America, and South America.

References

Further reading

 
 

Reduviidae
Articles created by Qbugbot
Insects described in 1930